Arewa House (Hausa: Gidan Arewa) is centre for research and historical documentations under Ahmadu Bello University, Zaria, located in Kaduna, Kaduna State, in Northwest Nigeria. It is also serves as a center for historical documentation and research of the Ahmadu Bello University, Zaria, Nigeria. Dr Shuaibu Shehu Aliyu is the current Director of the House.

History

Arewa House is the center for historical documentation and research of the Ahmadu Bello University, Zaria, Nigeria. Located at No. 1 Rabah Road, in the Residence of the late Premier of Northern Nigeria, Sir Ahmadu Bello Sokoto, Sardauna of Sokoto. Arewa House was established in 1970 as a centre for Research and Historical Documentation under the directorship of Professor Abdullahi Smith who died in 1984 and was succeeded by Dr. Bashir Ikara in 1986.  The center is concerned, not only with research and documentation of the history and culture of the people, but also with contemporary studies on Policy, Peace and Leadership. The aim of the House therefore is to serve as a center for documentation and research in history and contemporary challenges.

Though under the authority of Ahmadu Bello University Zaria, Arewa House has an independent Board of Trustees and Governing Council. It is headed by an executive Director, who runs the day-to-day activities of the House.

Research 
As a center for historical documentation and research, Arewa House is concerned with procuring, preserving, analyzing and discussing issues of national and International interest and in particular with issues of specific interest to the development of northern Nigeria. The history of Arewa House as a Center for Research and Historical Documentation goes back to the year 1970 when the “History of Northern Nigerian Committee” was given the responsibility of writing a book on the history of northern Nigeria. This was after the dissolution of the three regional governments in the country and the creation of twelve states, which also led to the establishment of the “Joint Interim Common Services Agency” (ICSA) to oversee the joint assets and liabilities of the six newly created northern states. It was in this respect that the residence of the late premier of the Northern region, Sir Ahmadu Bello Sardauna, was formally approved to serve as an office for this project with the name “Arewa House”.

A distinguished scholar, Professor Abdullahi Smith, founding member of the Dept. of History, A.B.U. was appointed as its first Director. In 1975, the control of Arewa House was transferred to Ahmadu Bello University, Zaria on the orders of the then Federal Government of Nigeria. Under Professor Smith, a solid foundation was set that made Arewa House a unique place for research and historical documentation in the whole of West Africa. Arewa House is today one of the few reputable research centers with an enviable core collection of books and manuscripts including higher degree dissertations from various Universities in Nigeria and abroad. These dissertations cut across different fields of study, most particularly humanities and social sciences. Most of these dissertations are of thematic interest to the study of Northern Nigeria. These collections are further strengthened by a rare collection of Arabic manuscripts, Premier's office records, government publications, Newspapers and other serial publications, which are housed in the Archives.

Arewa House welcomes research students and provides research affiliation to students from all parts of the world conducting research on any aspects of the state and society in Northern Nigeria. Notably is also the established external center for regional development AREWA Center for Regional Development (ACRD) - https://www.arewaonline-ng.com/ - which was founded in June 2016 based on the United Nations (UN) documents of UNCRD - ECOSOC resolutions 1086 C of 18 June 1971 with the vision to achieve a sustainable living environment, safe, secure, equitable and inclusive development in harmony with the environment for the people of the northern region of Nigeria popularly known in Hausa language as “Arewa”.

Arewa House has a moderate and affordable accommodation for researchers and non-researchers who are duly registered with it. Other facilities include a Conference hall, Training rooms, Bookshop and a Restaurant.

Structure and use
Arewa House is structured in four major departments, for effective management and these includes: Research, Library, Archives and museum. Arewa Museum houses cultural artifacts, photographs and books which are accessible to the public. It contains Nineteen (19) satellite galleries which exhibits the culture and people of Northern Nigeria and also chronicles the life of Ahmadu Bello. It is presently the centre for historical documentation and research of the Ahmadu Bello University, Zaria, Nigeria. Arewa House Library is today of the few reputable research center library with an enviable core collections of books and manuscripts including higher degree dissertations from various universities in Nigeria and abroad. These dissertations cut across the fields of humanities and social science which many of them are thematic interest to the study of Northern Nigeria. the library also have special collections from prominent Nigerians who has donated there collection to make impact in the Northern - Nigeria.  Arewa House Archive has rare collections of Arabic manuscripts, the late premier office records, Government publications and newspapers, gift and donations from Central Bank of Nigeria, individuals and other serial publications.

Mandate of Arewa House

 Maintenance of Museum as a memorabilia to the life and work of the late Sardauna of Sokoto, and illustrative of the cultural traditions of the North.
Organisation of academic and cultural activities appropriately associated with such Museum, together with an advisory service for State Governments in the field of Museum development;Maintenance of an Archive to house the records of the former Government of Northern Nigeria;
 Organisation of services appropriately associated with such an Archive, including an information service for state Governments, and practical facilities for training of State Archives
 Maintenance of research library to include all printed publications (including government publications) bearing on the history of the North, together with manuscripts, theses, maps, pictures, tape-recordings etc.
 Promotion of research on the history of the North in all aspects and periods by members of senior staff of the House, and the provision of facilities for approved post-graduate workers in this field from other Institutions (including facilities for post–graduate work by government personnel in education, information, and cultural affairs, tourism, Community development, etc.).
 Publication of the results of research undertaken at Arewa House in the form of books and journals to be published by the House.

Bibliography

References

External links

Museums in Nigeria
1950 in Nigeria
Residential buildings in Nigeria